Arbouretum is an American alternative rock band started by musician Dave Heumann in 2002. They have released ten albums, four of them on Thrill Jockey Records.

Discography

Albums
 Long Live the Well-Doer (2004)
 Rites of Uncovering (2007)	
 Song of the Pearl (2009)		
 Sister Ray (2010)
 The Gathering (2011)
 Covered In Leaves (2012)
 A Gourd Of Gold (2013)
 Coming Out of the Fog (2013)
 Song of the Rose (2017)
 Let It All In (2020)

EPs
 Kale (2008) EP split with Pontiak
 Aureola (2012) EP split with Hush Arbors

References

American folk rock groups